Garcia Lane (born December 31, 1961) is a former American football defensive back. He played for the Kansas City Chiefs in 1985 and 1987.

References

1961 births
Living people
American football defensive backs
Ohio State Buckeyes football players
Philadelphia/Baltimore Stars players
Kansas City Chiefs players
National Football League replacement players